Arc-en-Ciel (French, 'rainbow') or L'Arc-en-Ciel may refer to:

 Arc-en-Ciel (newspaper), Burundi
 Arcenciel, a Lebanese NGO
 L'Arc-en-Ciel, a Japanese rock band
 L'arc-en-ciel (film), a 2009 short feature film
 Several aircraft designed by René Couzinet:
 Couzinet 10 Arc-en-Ciel, a 1928 three-engined monoplane
 Couzinet 11 Arc-en-Ciel II, a variant
 Couzinet 70 Arc-en-Ciel III, a 1930s three-engined monoplane which crossed the Atlantic
 Arc-en-Ciel International School, in Lome, Togo
 "Arc-en-Ciel", a 2019 song by Booba

See also
 
 
 
 
 Rainbow (disambiguation)
 Arconciel, a municipality in Switzerland